Billy Bailey (January 1947 – January 25, 1996) was a convicted murderer who was hanged in Delaware in 1996. He became the third person to be hanged in the United States since 1965 (the previous two were Charles Rodman Campbell and Westley Allan Dodd, both in Washington), and the first person hanged in Delaware in 50 years. As of 2023, he remains the last person to be lawfully executed by hanging in the United States.

Early life 
The ninth of 23 children, Bailey lived in stark poverty and suffered chronic physical abuse, state records show. His mother died when he was less than a year old. As an adult, Bailey was known to police as a brawler and a thief.

The crime
In 1979, after being convicted of forgery, Bailey was assigned to the Plummer House, a work release facility in Wilmington, Delaware, but soon escaped. He later appeared at the home of his foster sister, Sue Ann Coker, in Cheswold, Delaware, saying he was upset and was not going back to the Plummer House.

He and Charles Coker, his foster sister's husband, went on an errand in Coker's truck. Bailey asked Coker to stop at a liquor store. Bailey entered the store and robbed the clerk at gunpoint.

At Lambertson's Corner, Bailey entered the farmhouse of Gilbert Lambertson, aged 80, and his wife, Clara Lambertson, aged 73. Bailey shot Gilbert Lambertson twice in the chest with a pistol, and once in the head with the Lambertsons' shotgun. He also shot Clara Lambertson once in the shoulder with the pistol, and once each in the abdomen and neck with the shotgun. Both Lambertsons died. Bailey arranged their bodies in chairs, and then fled from the scene. He was spotted by a Delaware State Police helicopter as he ran across the Lambertsons' field. He attempted to shoot the helicopter co-pilot with the pistol, and was later arrested.

Conviction
Bailey was found guilty of the murders in 1980. After his conviction, the jury found that his crimes "were outrageously or wantonly vile, horrible, or inhuman", and recommended a death sentence. Bailey was sentenced to be hanged by his neck until dead.

Preparations 

Although the method of execution in Delaware had been changed to lethal injection in 1986, he had the legal option of choosing to be hanged instead. Bailey refused to accept lethal injection, telling a visitor, "I'm not going to let them put me to sleep."

As Delaware had not carried out a hanging in 50 years, state officials sought advice from corrections officials at Washington State Penitentiary in Walla Walla, Washington, where hangings had recently been performed.

The wooden gallows were built on the grounds of the Delaware Correctional Center at Smyrna in 1986, where Bailey was imprisoned, prior to January 9, 1987, which was one of Bailey's execution dates prior to January 25, 1996. The structure required renovation and strengthening before Bailey could be executed on it.

Delaware used an execution protocol written by Fred Leuchter. The area of the rope sliding inside the knot was lubricated with melted paraffin wax, to allow it to slide freely. A black hood was specified by the protocol, as was a sandbag to test the trap door and a "collapse board" to which a prisoner could be strapped if necessary.

Bailey was moved from his prison cell to the execution trailer used for lethal injection prior to the execution. There, he spent his last 24 hours, sleeping, eating, watching television, talking with staff, and meeting with his fifty-three-year-old sister, Betty Odom, the prison chaplain, and his attorney. For his last meal, he requested a well-done steak, a baked potato with sour cream and butter, buttered rolls, peas, and vanilla ice cream.

His final appeals having failed, Bailey was executed on January 25, 1996.The gallows in Delaware were dismantled in 2003, because in that year, none of its death row inmates remained eligible to choose hanging over lethal injection.

See also 
 Capital punishment in Delaware
 Capital punishment in the United States
 List of people executed in Delaware

References

External links
 CNN article on Bailey's hanging

1947 births
1996 deaths
People from Smyrna, Delaware
American people executed for murder
1979 murders in the United States
20th-century executions by Delaware
People executed by Delaware by hanging
Executed people from Delaware
People convicted of murder by Delaware
20th-century executions of American people